Xelîlê Çaçan Mûradov (1924–1981), was a Yazidi Kurdish writer and journalist in the Soviet Union. He was head of Kurdish section of Radio Yerevan for almost 24 years, where more than 1400 folkloric Kurdish songs were recorded under his supervision. He has also authored several books on Kurdish folklore. He was the father of Yazidi writer and journalist Têmûrê Xelîl.

See also 

Yazidis in Armenia

Books
Kilamên Cimaeta Kurdan, 1963.
Du Poêm (Folk stories of Memê û Eyşê and Zembîlfiroş in poetry),  1965.
Qisên Cimaetê (Collection of Folklore), 1969.
Morîyê Nenê, Novel, 1972.

External links
A Short History of Kurdish novel, by Firat Cewerî (in Kurdish).
Xelîlê Çaçan, by Wezîrê Eşo (in Kurdish).

1924 births
1981 deaths
Kurdish writers
Soviet writers